Halothane (also known as 2-bromo-2-chloro-1,1,1-trifluoroethane), sold under the brand name Fluothane among others, is a general anaesthetic. It can be used to induce or maintain anaesthesia. One of its benefits is that it does not increase the production of saliva, which can be particularly useful in those who are difficult to intubate. It is given by inhalation.

Side effects include an irregular heartbeat, respiratory depression, and hepatotoxicity. Like all volatile anesthetics, it should not be used in people with a personal or family history of malignant hyperthermia. It appears to be safe in porphyria. It is unclear whether its usage during pregnancy is harmful to the fetus, and its use during a C-section is generally discouraged. Halothane is a chiral molecule that is used as a racemic mixture.

Halothane was discovered in 1955. It was approved for medical use in the United States in 1958. It is on the World Health Organization's List of Essential Medicines. Its use in developed countries has been mostly replaced by newer anesthetic agents such as sevoflurane. It is no longer commercially available in the United States. Halothane also contributes to ozone depletion.

Medical uses

It is a potent anesthetic with a minimum alveolar concentration (MAC) of 0.74%. Its blood/gas partition coefficient of 2.4 makes it an agent with moderate induction and recovery time. It is not a good analgesic and its muscle relaxation effect is moderate.

Side effects
Side effects include irregular heartbeat, respiratory depression, and hepatotoxicity. It appears to be safe in porphyria. It is unclear whether use during pregnancy is harmful to the baby, and it is not generally recommended for use during a C-section.
In rare cases, repeated exposure to halothane in adults was noted to result in severe liver injury. This occurred in about one in 10,000 exposures. The resulting syndrome was referred to as halothane hepatitis, immunoallergic in origin, and is thought to result from the metabolism of halothane to trifluoroacetic acid via oxidative reactions in the liver. About 20% of inhaled halothane is metabolized by the liver and these products are excreted in the urine. The hepatitis syndrome had a mortality rate of 30% to 70%. Concern for hepatitis resulted in a dramatic reduction in the use of halothane for adults and it was replaced in the 1980s by enflurane and isoflurane. By 2005, the most common volatile anesthetics used were isoflurane, sevoflurane, and desflurane. Since the risk of halothane hepatitis in children was substantially lower than in adults, halothane continued to be used in pediatrics in the 1990s as it was especially useful for inhalation induction of anesthesia. However, by 2000, sevoflurane, excellent for inhalation induction, had largely replaced the use of halothane in children.

Halothane sensitises the heart to catecholamines, so it is liable to cause cardiac arrhythmia, occasionally fatal, particularly if hypercapnia has been allowed to develop.  This seems to be especially problematic in dental anesthesia.

Like all the potent inhalational anaesthetic agents, it is a potent trigger for malignant hyperthermia.  Similarly, in common with the other potent inhalational agents, it relaxes uterine smooth muscle and this may increase blood loss during delivery or termination of pregnancy.

Occupational safety 
People can be exposed to halothane in the workplace by breathing it in as waste anaesthetic gas, skin contact, eye contact, or swallowing it. The National Institute for Occupational Safety and Health (NIOSH) has set a recommended exposure limit (REL) of 2 ppm (16.2 mg/m3) over 60 minutes.

Pharmacology
The exact mechanism of the action of general anaesthetics has not been delineated. Halothane activates GABAA and glycine receptors. It also acts as an NMDA receptor antagonist, inhibits nACh and voltage-gated sodium channels, and activates 5-HT3 and twin-pore K+ channels. It does not affect the AMPA or kainate receptors.

Chemical and physical properties

Chemically, halothane is an alkyl halide (not an ether like many other anesthetics). The structure has one stereocenter, so (R)- and (S)-optical isomers occur.

Synthesis
The commercial synthesis of halothane starts from trichloroethylene, which is reacted with hydrogen fluoride in the presence of antimony trichloride at 130 °C to form 2-chloro-1,1,1-trifluoroethane. This is then reacted with bromine at 450 °C to produce halothane.

Related substances
Attempts to find anesthetics with less metabolism led to halogenated ethers such as enflurane and isoflurane. The incidence of hepatic reactions with these agents is lower. The exact degree of hepatotoxic potential of enflurane is debated, although it is minimally metabolized. Isoflurane is essentially not metabolized and reports of associated liver injury are quite rare. Small amounts of trifluoroacetic acid can be formed from both halothane and isoflurane metabolism and possibly accounts for cross sensitization of patients between these agents.

The main advantage of the more modern agents is lower blood solubility, resulting in faster induction of and recovery from anaesthesia.

History
Halothane was first synthesized by C. W. Suckling of Imperial Chemical Industries in 1951 at the ICI Widnes Laboratory and was first used clinically by M. Johnstone in Manchester in 1956. Initially, many pharmacologists and anaesthesiologists had doubts about the safety and efficacy of the new drug. But halothane, which required specialist knowledge and technologies for safe administration, also afforded British anaesthesiologists the opportunity to remake their speciality as a profession during a period, when the newly established National Health Service needed more specialist consultants. In this context, halothane eventually became popular as a nonflammable general anesthetic replacing other volatile anesthetics such as trichloroethylene, diethyl ether and cyclopropane. In many parts of the world it has been largely replaced by newer agents since the 1980s but is still widely used in developing countries because of its lower cost.

Halothane was given to many millions of people worldwide from its introduction in 1956 through the 1980s. Its properties include cardiac depression at high levels, cardiac sensitization to catecholamines such as norepinephrine, and potent bronchial relaxation. Its lack of airway irritation made it a common inhalation induction agent in pediatric anesthesia. 
Its use in developed countries has been mostly replaced by newer anesthetic agents such as sevoflurane. It is not commercially available in the United States.

Society and culture

Availability
It is on the World Health Organization's List of Essential Medicines. It is available as a volatile liquid, at 30, 50, 200, and 250 ml per container but in many developed nations is not available having been displaced by newer agents.

It is the only inhalational anesthetic containing bromine, which makes it radiopaque. It is colorless and pleasant-smelling, but unstable in light. It is packaged in dark-colored bottles and contains 0.01% thymol as a stabilizing agent.

Ozone depletion
Halothane is an ozone depleting substance with an ODP of 1.56 and it is calculated to be responsible for 1% of total stratospheric ozone layer depletion.

References

External links 
 

5-HT3 agonists
GABAA receptor positive allosteric modulators
General anesthetics
Glycine receptor agonists
Hepatitis
Hepatotoxins
Nicotinic antagonists
NMDA receptor antagonists
Organobromides
Organochlorides
Organofluorides
Trifluoromethyl compounds
Wikipedia medicine articles ready to translate
Withdrawn drugs
World Health Organization essential medicines
Ozone depletion
Racemic mixtures